Maharaji Prajapati is an Indian politician. She was elected to Amethi in the 2022 Uttar Pradesh Legislative Assembly election as a member of the Samajwadi Party. She is the wife of the former minister Gayatri Prasad Prajapati.

References

Living people
Year of birth missing (living people)
Uttar Pradesh MLAs 2022–2027
Women members of the Uttar Pradesh Legislative Assembly
Samajwadi Party politicians
21st-century Indian women politicians